WFNW (1380 KHz, "Radío Press") is a radio station licensed to Naugatuck, Connecticut.  The station is owned by Candido Dias Carrelo.  It airs a Portuguese Contemporary radio format. 
The station has been assigned the WFNW call letters by the Federal Communications Commission since February 13, 1989.

By day, WFNW is powered at 3,500 watts.  But at night, to avoid interference with other stations on 1380 AM, it reduces power to 350 watts.  It uses a directional antenna at all times.  Its transmitter is on Thunderbird Drive in Naugatuck.

References

External links

Naugatuck, Connecticut
FNW
Portuguese-language radio stations in the United States
Radio stations established in 1961
1961 establishments in Connecticut
Contemporary hit radio stations in the United States